Kazakhstan competed in the 2008 Summer Olympics, held in Beijing, People's Republic of China from August 8 to August 24, 2008.

Medalists

Disqualified Medalists

Archery

Athletics

Men
Track & road events

Field events

Combined events – Decathlon

Women
Track & road events

Field events

Combined events – Heptathlon

Boxing

Canoeing

Slalom

Sprint

Qualification Legend: QS = Qualify to semi-final; QF = Qualify directly to final

Cycling

Road

Gymnastics

Rhythmic

Handball

Women's tournament

Roster

Group play

Judo

Men

Women

Modern pentathlon

Rowing 

Women

Qualification Legend: FA=Final A (medal); FB=Final B (non-medal); FC=Final C (non-medal); FD=Final D (non-medal); FE=Final E (non-medal); FF=Final F (non-medal); SA/B=Semifinals A/B; SC/D=Semifinals C/D; SE/F=Semifinals E/F; QF=Quarterfinals; R=Repechage

Shooting 

Men

Women

Swimming 

Men

Women

Synchronized swimming

Table tennis

Taekwondo 

* Ángel Matos (Cuba) was leading 3–2 in the bronze medal bout against Arman Chilmanov, until he apparently suffered a broken toe, and was subsequently disqualified for exceeding the allotted one minute of injury time. Matos kicked referee Chakir Chelbat in the face, pushed a judge and spat on the floor of the arena before being escorted out by security. His coach, Leodis González, criticized the referee's ruling as stricter and also accused Kazakhstan of bribing officials. The World Taekwondo Federation (WTF) said that Matos and González (pending IOC approval and a possible appeal) would be banned from all its future sanctioned events and his records at the Beijing Games would be erased.

Triathlon

Volleyball

Women's indoor tournament 

Kazakhstan entered a team in the women's tournament. The team lost all but one of its matches, and didn't qualify for the final rounds. The team's final ranking was tied for 9th place.

Roster

Group play

Weightlifting 

Men

Women

Wrestling 

Men's freestyle

Men's Greco-Roman

 Nurbakyt Tengizbayev originally finished third, but in November 2016, he was promoted to second place due to disqualification of Vitaliy Rahimov.

Women's freestyle

References

Nations at the 2008 Summer Olympics
2008
Summer Olympics